Vehicle of Spirit is a video and audio release from Finnish symphonic metal band Nightwish. Two shows have been recorded during Endless Forms Most Beautiful World Tour; one at Tampere Stadium (July 31, 2015) and the other at Wembley Arena (December 19, 2015). Also, various songs were recorded around the world. It was released on December 16, 2016 in Europe and January 7, 2017 in North America.

Track listing 

The Wembley Show

The Tampere Show

Extras (Blu-Ray 2 + DVD 3)

The Wembley Show - CD 1

The Wembley Show - CD 2

Charts

References 

2016 live albums
2016 video albums
Nightwish video albums